The 1945–46 season was the 39th year of football played by Dundee United, and covers the period from 1 July 1945 to 30 June 1946. United finished in twelfth place in the Southern League Second Division.

Match results
Dundee United played a total of 37 competitive matches during the 1945–46 season.

Legend

All results are written with Dundee United's score first.
Own goals in italics

Division B

Victory Cup

Southern League Cup

Supplementary Cup

See also
 1945–46 in Scottish football

References

Dundee United F.C. seasons
Dundee United